The 15th Annual Latin Grammy Awards was held on November 20, 2014 at the MGM Grand Garden Arena in Paradise. This was the first time that Latin Grammys has been held at this location. The main telecast was broadcast on Univision at 8:00PM EST.

The nominations were announced on September 24, 2014. Puerto Rican musician  Eduardo Cabra led the nominations with ten nominations each. Joan Manuel Serrat was honored as the Latin Recording Academy Person of the Year on November 19, the day prior to the Latin Grammy Awards.

Awards
The following is a list of nominees and winners (in bold):

General
Record of the Year
Jorge Drexler featuring Ana Tijoux — "Universos Paralelos"
 Pablo Alborán featuring Jesse & Joy — "Dónde está el Amor"
 Marc Anthony — "Cambio de Piel"
 Calle 13 — "Respira el Momento"
 Camila — "Decidiste Dejarme"
 Luis Fonsi featuring Juan Luis Guerra — "Llegaste Tú"
 Enrique Iglesias featuring Descemer Bueno and Gente de Zona — "Bailando"
 Prince Royce — "Darte un Beso"
 Carlos Vives featuring Marc Anthony — "Cuando Nos Volvamos a Encontrar"
 Carlos Vives featuring ChocQuibTown — "El Mar de Sus Ojos"

Album of the Year
Paco de Lucía — Canción Andaluza
 Marc Anthony — 3.0
 Rubén Blades — Tangos
 Calle 13 — Multi Viral
 Camila — Elypse
 Lila Downs, Niña Pastori, Soledad — Raíz
 Jorge Drexler — Bailar en la Cueva
 Fonseca and the National Symphony Orchestra of Colombia — Sinfónico
 Jarabe de Palo — Somos
 Carlos Vives — Más Corazón Profundo

Song of the Year
Descemer Bueno, Gente de Zona and Enrique Iglesias — "Bailando"
 Caetano Veloso — "A Bossa Nova É Foda"
 Yoel Henríquez and Julio Reyes Copello — "Cambio de Piel" (Marc Anthony)
 Manu Moreno and Aleks Syntek — "Corazones Invencibles"
 Andrés Castro and Carlos Vives — "Cuando Nos Volvamos a Encontrar" (Carlos Vives featuring Marc Anthony)
 Andrés Castro, Guianko Gómez, Juan Riveros and Prince Royce — "Darte un Beso" (Prince Royce)
 Mario Domm, Lauren Evans and Mónica Vélez — "Decidiste Dejarme" (Camila)
 Jesse & Joy — "Mi Tesoro"
 Calle 13 and Silvio Rodríguez — "Ojos Color Sol"
 Jorge Drexler and Ana Tijoux — "Universos Paralelos"

Best New Artist
Mariana Vega
Aneeka
Linda Briceño
Caloncho
Julio César
Pablo López
Miranda
Periko & Jessi León
Daniela Spalla
Juan Pablo Vega

Pop
Best Contemporary Pop Vocal Album
Camila — Elypse
Debi Nova — Soy
Rosario — Rosario
Santana — Corazón (Deluxe Version)
Mariana Vega — Mi Burbuja

Best Traditional Pop Vocal Album
Fonseca and the National Symphony Orchestra of Colombia — Sinfónico
Andrea Bocelli — Amor En Portofino
Linda Briceño — Tiempo
Café Quijano — Orígenes: El Bolero Volumen 2
Marco Antonio Solís — Gracias Por Estar Aqui

Urban
Best Urban Performance
Enrique Iglesias featuring Descemer Bueno and Gente de Zona — "Bailando"
J Balvin featuring Farruko — "6 AM"
Calle 13 — "Adentro"
Don Omar — "Pura Vida"
Wisin — "Que Viva la Vida"

Best Urban Music Album
Calle 13 — Multi Viral
Alexis & Fido — La Esencia
J Balvin — La Familia
Yandel — De Líder a Leyenda
Daddy Yankee — King Daddy

Best Urban Song
Descemer Bueno, Gente de Zona and Enrique Iglesias — "Bailando"
Calle 13 — "Adentro"
Calle 13 — "Cuando Los Pies Besan El Piso"
J Balvin and Farruko — "6 AM"
André Célis and Ana Tijoux — "Vengo"

Rock
Best Rock Album
Molotov — Agua Maldita
Enrique Bunbury — Palosanto
Doctor Krápula — Ama-Zonas
Don Tetto — Don Tetto
Luz Verde — El Final Del Mundo Vol. II: Nada Es Imposible

Best Pop/Rock Album
Juanes — Loco de Amor
Airbag — Libertad
Elefantes — El Rinoceronte
Jarabe de Palo — Somos
Vega — Wolverines

Best Rock Song
Andrés Calamaro — "Cuando No Estás"
Rubén Albarrán, Doctor Krápula, Roco Pachukote and Moyenei Valdez — "Ama-Zonas"
Enrique Bunbury — "Despierta"
Emmanuel Del Real and Juanes — "Mil Pedazos" (Juanes)
Clemente Castillo, Charly Castro and Flip Tamez — "Sin Respuesta" (Jumbo)
Jarabe de Palo — "Somos" (Jarabe De Palo featuring Gabylonia and Montse "La Duende")

Alternative
Best Alternative Music Album
Babasónicos — Romantisísmico
Caloncho — Fruta
Los Cafres — Los Cafres - 25 Años De Música!
Siddhartha — El Vuelo Del Pez
Sig Ragga — Aquelarre

Best Alternative Song
Calle 13 — "El Aguante"
Gustavo Cortés and Sig Ragga — "Chaplin" (Sig Ragga)
 Jesús Báez Caballero and Siddhartha — "El Aire" (Siddhartha)
Adrián Rodríguez and Diego Rodríguez — "La Lanza" (Babasónicos)
Yayo González — "Vamos A Morir" (Pate de Fua featuring Catalina García)

Tropical
Best Salsa Album
Marc Anthony — 3.0
Maite Hontelé — Déjame Así
Tito Nieves — Mis Mejores Recuerdos
Aymee Nuviola — First Class To Havana
Mario Ortiz All Star Band — 50 Aniversario

Best Cumbia/Vallenato Album
Jorge Celedón and Various Artists — Celedón Sin Fronteras 1
Dubán Bayona & Jimmy Zambrano — Métete en el Viaje
Diomedes Díaz and Álvaro López — La Vida del Artista
Alejandro Palacio — La Voz del Ídolo
Juan Piña — Cantándole a Mi Valle

Best Contemporary Tropical Album
Carlos Vives — Más Corazón Profundo
Julio César — Todo Empieza Soñando
Jorge Luis Chacín — El Color De Mi Locura...
Palo! — Palo! Live
Prince Royce — Soy el MismoBest Traditional Tropical Album
La Sonora Santanera — Grandes Exitos de Las Sonoras: Con La Más Grande, La Sonora Santanera
Alquimia La Sonora Del XXI — Sentimiento AnacoberoEliades Ochoa and El Cuarteto Patria — El Eliades Que SoyPijuan and Los Baby Boomer Boys — Solo Pa' Los Jóvenes... de Corazón
Viento de Agua — Opus IV

Best Tropical Song
Andrés Castro and Carlos Vives — "Cuando Nos Volvamos a Encontrar" (Carlos Vives featuring Marc Anthony)
Andrés Castro, Guianko Gómez, Juan Riveros and Prince Royce — "Darte un Beso" (Prince Royce)
Descemer Bueno and Enrique Iglesias — "Loco" (Enrique Iglesias featuring Romeo Santos)
Jorge Luis Chacin and Fernando Osorio — "Regalo" (Rey Ruiz)
Johann Morales — "Te Doy Mi Voz" (Ronald Borjas)

Singer-songwriter
Best Singer-Songwriter Album
Jorge Drexler — Bailar en la Cueva
Ricardo Arjona — ViajeAndrés Calamaro — BohemioPablo Milanés — RenacimientoRosana — 8 LunasRegional Mexican
Best Ranchero Album
Pepe Aguilar — Lástima Que Sean Ajenas
Oscar Cruz — ¿Quien Dice Que No?Vicente Fernández — Mano a Mano Tangos a La Manera de Vicente FernándezOlivia Gorra — Bésame Mucho EspañaJuan Montalvo — Mujeres DivinasBest Banda Album
Banda El Recodo De Don Cruz Lizarraga — Haciendo Historia
Cristina — Grandes Canciones
La Arrolladora Banda El Limón — Gracias Por CreerLa Original Banda El Limón De Salvador Lizárraga — Fin De Semana
Luz María — Lágrimas y Lluvia

Best Tejano Album
Jimmy González & Grupo Mazz — Forever Mazz
Chente Barrera — ¡Viva Tejano!
Grupo Alamo — Seguimos Soñando
Shelly Lares — De Mi Corazón
Jay Pérez — Anthology Back In The Day

Best Norteño Album
Conjunto Primavera — Amor Amor
El Poder Del Norte — XX Años
Los Rieleros del Norte — En Tus Manos
Pesado — Por Ti
Polo Urias y Su Máquina Norteña — Clásicas De Ayer Y Siempre

Best Regional Song
Marco Antonio Solís — "De Mil Amores"
José Luis Roma — "Amor Amor" (Conjunto Primavera)
Mario Alberto Zapata — "Cuando Estás De Buenas" (Pesado)
Paulina Aguirre and Alberto "Beto" Jiménez Maeda — "Mirando Hacia Arriba" (Mariachi Divas de Cindy Shea)
Afid Ferrer — Tonto Corazón (Siggno)

Instrumental
Best Instrumental Album
Arturo O'Farrill and the Chico O'Farrill Afro-Cuban Jazz Orchestra — Final Night at Birdland
Antonio Adolfo — O Piano de Antonio Adolfo
Yamandu Costa — Continente
Hamilton de Holanda — Caprichos
Mónica Fuquen — Esferas de Creación

Traditional
Best Folk Album
Lila Downs, Niña Pastori and Soledad — Raíz
Albita, Eva Ayllón and Olga Cerpa — Mujeres Con Cajones
C4 Trío and Rafael "Pollo" Brito — De Repente
Orozco - Barrientos — Tinto
Totó la Momposina — El Asunto

Best Tango Album
Rubén Blades — Tangos
Carlos Franzetti — In The Key Of Tango
Mónica Navarro — Calle 
Tanghetto — Hybrid Tango II
Marianela Villalobos — Amor y Tango

Best Flamenco Album
Paco de Lucía — Canción Andaluza
Juan Carmona — AlchemyaEnrique Morente — Morente
Juan Pinilla and Fernando Valverde — Jugar Con Fuego
Rosario La Tremendita — Fatum

Jazz
Best Latin Jazz AlbumChick Corea — The Vigil Paquito D'Rivera and Trio Corrente — Song For MauraJuan Garcia-Herreros — Normas
Arturo O'Farril and the Afro Latin Jazz Orchestra — The Offense Of The Drum
Luisito Quintero — 3rd Element

Christian
Best Spanish Christian AlbumDanilo Montero — La Carta Perfecta - En VivoAmor Mercy — Desde Arriba Todo Se Ve Differente
 Lenny Salcedo — Nuevo
Nirlon Sánchez — Es El Tiempo De Dios
Marcos Vidal — Sigo Esperándote
Marcos Witt — Sigues Siendo Dios
Coalo Zamorano — Confesiones De Un Corazón Agradecido

Best Portuguese Christian AlbumAline Barros — GraçaAnderson Freire — Anderson Freire E Amigos
Jotta A — Geração De Jesus
Soraya Moraes — Céu Na Terra
Renascer Praise — Renascer Praise 18 - Canto De Sião

Brazilian
Best Brazilian Contemporary Pop AlbumIvete Sangalo — Multishow Ao Vivo – Ivete Sangalo 20 AnosMarília Bessy and Ney Matogrosso — Infernynho - Marília Bessy Convida Ney Matogrosso
Ana Carolina — #AC
Vanessa da Mata — Segue o Som
Jota Quest — Funky Funky Boom Boom

Best Brazilian Rock AlbumErasmo Carlos — Gigante GentilCharlie Brown Jr. — La Familia 013
O Rappa — Nunca Tem Fim...
Nando Reis e Os Infernais — Sei, Como Foi Em BH
Titãs — Nheengatu

Best Samba/Pagode AlbumMaria Rita — Coração a BatucarAlcione — Eterna Alegria Ao Vivo
Martinho da Vila — Enredo
Paula Lima — O Samba É Do Bem
Diogo Nogueira — Mais Amor

Best MPB AlbumMarisa Monte — Verdade, Uma IlusãoZeca Baleiro — Calma Aí, Coração - Ao Vivo
Jeneci — De Graça
Ivan Lins & InventaRio — InventaRio Encontra Ivan Lins
Nana, Dori and Danilo — Caymmi

Best Sertaneja Music AlbumSérgio Reis — Questão De TempoChitãozinho & Xororó — Do Tamanho Do Nosso Amor - Ao Vivo
Paula Fernandes — Multishow Ao Vivo – Um Ser Amor
Rick & Renner — Bom De Dança Vol. 2
Victor & Leo — Viva Por Mim

Best Brazilian Roots AlbumFalamansa — Amigo VelhoCajú & Castanha — Meu Deus Que País É Esse!
Toninho Ferragutti e Neymar Dias — Festa Na Roça
Tavinho Moura — Minhas Canções Inacabadas
Quinteto Violado — Quinteto Canta Gonzagão
Alceu Valença — Amigo Da Arte

Best Brazilian SongCaetano Veloso — "A Bossa Nova É Foda"Dori Caymmi and Paulo Cesar Pinheiro — "Alguma Voz" (Dori Caymmi)
Zeca Baleiro and Hyldon — "Calma Aí, Coração"
Maria Bethânia and Paulo César Pinheiro — "Carta De Amor"
Vanessa da Mata — "Segue O Som"
Paula Fernandes — "Um Ser Amor"
Anitta, Jefferson Junior and Umberto Tavares — "Zen" (Anitta)

Children's
Best Latin Children's AlbumMarta Gómez and Friends — Coloreando: Traditional Songs For Children In SpanishMister G — ABC Fiesta
Rita Rosa — Rumba Flora: La Historia De Uva Y Garbancito
Thalía — Viva Kids Vol. 1
Xuxa — XSPB 12

Classical
Best Classical AlbumPlácido Domingo — VerdiFacundo Ramírez — A Piazzolla A Ramírez
Allison Brewster Franzetti — Alma - Piano Music Of Argentina
José Serebrier — Dvorák: Symphony No. 2 - 3 Slavonic Dances
Manuel Barrueco and the Symphony Orchestra of Tenerife — Medea
National Symphony Orchestra of Costa Rica — Musica De Compositores Costarricenses Vol.1
Berta Rojas — Salsa Roja

Best Classical Contemporary CompositionClaudia Montero — "Concierto Para Violín y Orquesta de Cuerdas"Gustavo Casenave — "Bicho Feeling Home Piano Solo"
Arlene Sierra — "Moler"
Yalil Guerra — "String Quartet No.2"
Gabriela Ortiz — "¡Únicamente La Verdad!, La Auténtica Historia de Camelia La Texana"

Recording Package
Best Recording PackageWed 21  — Alejandro Ros (Juana Molina)Alfredo Enciso  — Activistas (Nonpalidece)
Rafael Rocha  — Antes Que Tu Conte Outra (Apanhador Só)
Giovanni Nésterez  — Combi (Lucho Quequezana)
Laura Varsky  — Ocho(Marco Sanguinetti)

Production
Best Engineered AlbumJuber Anbín, Johnnatan García, Rodner Padilla, Eduardo Pulgar, Vladimir Quintero Mora, Jean Sánchez, Alexander Vanlawren, Germán Landaeta, Darío Peñaloza and Germán Landaeta — De Repente (C4 Trío and Rafael "Pollo" Brito)Facundo Rodríguez — Miss Delirios (Sandra Márquez)
Javier Limón, Salomé Limón, Marian G. Villota and Caco Refojo — Promesas De Tierra
Roger Freret, Claudio Spiewak and Felipe Tichauer — Rio, Choro, Jazz... (Antonio Adolfo) 
Juan Switalski — 21st Century Lyrical Clarinet Concertos (Eleanor Weingartner)

Producer of the YearSergio GeorgeRafa Arcaute
Eduardo Cabra
Andrés Castro
Moreno Veloso

Music Video
Best Short Form Music VideoLa Vida Bohème — "Flamingo"Babasónicos — "La Lanza"
Calle 13 — "Adentro"
Nach — "Me Llaman"
Zoé — "Arrullo De Estrellas"

Best Long Form Music VideoCafé Tacuba — El Objeto Antes Llamado Disco, La Película'''Jesse & Joy — Soltando al PerroSantana — Corazón: Live From Mexico - Live It To Believe ItVarious Artists — Música En TiemposVarious Artists — Triana Pura y Pura''

Special Merit Awards
The following is a list of special merit awards 

Lifetime Achievement Awards
Willy Chirino
Los Lobos
Valeria Lynch
César Costa
Carlos do Carmo
Dúo Dinámico
Ney Matogrosso

Trustees Award
André Midani
Juan Vicente Torrealba

Performers
Intro — "Latin Grammy 2014"
Calle 13 — "El Aguante"
Ricky Martin and Camila — "Perdón"
J Balvin — "Ay Vamos"
Pepe Aguilar featuring Miguel Bosé — "La Ley del Monte / Siempre En Mi Mente"
Mariana Vega, Pablo López and Aneeka — "De Tu Voz / VI / Ojo Por Ojo"
Carlos Vives featuring ChocQuibTown and Marc Anthony — "El Mar de Sus Ojos / Cuando Nos Volvamos a Encontrar"
Wisin, Pitbull and Chris Brown — "Control"
Rubén Blades — "Pedro Navaja"
Yandel, Gadiel and Farruko — "Plakito"
Juanes — "Me Enamora / La Camisa Negra / La Luz"
Magic! featuring Marc Anthony — "Rude"
Ricky Martin — "Adiós"
Pitbull and Carlos Santana — "Oye Como Va"
La Original Banda El Limón and Río Roma — "Fin de Semana / No Me Dolió"

Presenters
Natalia Jiménez, Kuno Becker and Jorge Drexler — presented Best Salsa Album
Sebastián Rulli and Angelique Boyer — presented Album of the Year
Lila Downs, Niña Pastori and Soledad — presented Song of the Year
Roselyn Sánchez — introduced Carlos Vives
Best Ranchero Album
Adrián Uribe and Eugenio Derbez — introduced Wisin, Pitbull and Chris Brown
Maite Perroni and Prince Royce — presented Best New Artist
Eiza González and Carlos PenaVega — presented Best Contemporary Tropical Album
Jaime Camil and Alessandra Ambrosio — presented Best Contemporary Pop Vocal Album
Debi Nova and Daniel Arenas — presented Record of the Year
Joaquín Sabina — presented Person of the Year

Changes to award categories
Best Tropical Fusion Album was combined with Best Contemporary Tropical Album.

References

External links
Official Site

Latin Grammy Awards
Latin Grammy Awards by year
Grammy Awards
Annual Latin Grammy Awards
Annual Latin Grammy Awards
Latin Grammy Awards, 15